The family Talpidae includes the moles (some of whom are called shrew moles and desmans) who are small insectivorous mammals of the order Eulipotyphla. Talpids are all digging animals to various degrees: moles are completely subterranean animals; shrew moles and shrew-like moles somewhat less so; and desmans, while basically aquatic, excavate dry sleeping chambers; whilst the quite unique star-nosed mole is equally adept in the water and underground. Talpids are found across the Northern Hemisphere of Eurasia and North America (although none are found in Ireland nor in the Americas south of northern Mexico), and range as far south as the montane regions of tropical Southeast Asia.

The first talpids evolved from shrew-like animals which adapted to digging late in the Eocene in Europe. Eotalpa anglica is the oldest known mole, it was discovered in the Late Eocene deposits of Hampshire Basin, UK. The most primitive living talpids are believed to be the shrew-like moles, with other species having adapted further into the subterranean, and, in some cases, aquatic lifestyles.

Characteristics
Talpids are small, dark-furred animals with cylindrical bodies and hairless, tubular snouts. They range in size from the tiny shrew moles of North America, as small as 10 cm in length and weighing under 12 grams, to the Russian desman, with a body length of 18–22 cm, and a weight of about 550 grams. The fur varies between species, but is always dense and short; desmans have waterproof undercoats and oily guard hairs, while the subterranean moles have short, velvety fur lacking any guard hairs. The forelimbs of moles are highly adapted for digging, with powerful claws, and the paws turned permanently outwards to aid in shovelling dirt away from the front of the body. By contrast, desmans have webbed paws with a fringe of stiff fur to aid in swimming. Moles generally have short tails, but those of desmans are elongated and flattened.

All species have small eyes and poor eyesight, but only a few are truly blind. The external ears are very small or absent. Talpids rely primarily on their sense of touch, having sensory vibrissae on their faces, legs, and tails. Their flexible snouts are particularly sensitive. Desmans are able to close both their nostrils and ears while diving. Unusually, the penis of talpids points backwards, and they have no scrotum.

Females have six or eight teats. Both sexes have claws on all five fingers and on all five toes. The paw has an additional bone called the os falciforme. In burrowing moles, the clavicle and the humeral head are connected. The tibia and the fibula are partially fused in all talpids. The pubis does not connect the two halves of the pelvic girdle. The skull is long, narrow, and rather flattened.

Talpids are generally insectivorous. Moles eat earthworms, insect larvae, and occasionally slugs, while desmans eat aquatic invertebrates such as shrimps, insect larvae, and snails. Talpids have relatively unspecialized teeth, with the dental formula:

Behavior

Desmans and shrew moles are primarily nocturnal, but moles are active day and night, usually travelling above ground only under cover of darkness. Most moles dig permanent burrows, and subsist largely on prey that falls into them.  The shrew moles dig burrows to access deep sleeping chambers, but forage for food on the forest floor by night. Desmans dig burrows in riverbanks for shelter and forage in the water of rivers and lakes.  The star-nosed mole is able to make a living much as other moles do, but are also very capable aquatic creatures, where they are able to smell underwater by using their unique proboscis to hold out a bubble of air into the water.

Talpids appear to be generally quite antisocial animals, and although at least one species, the star-nosed mole, will share burrows, talpids are known to engage in much territorial behavior, including extraordinarily fast battles.

Classification
The family is divided into three subfamilies, 19 genera and 59 species.
Family Talpidae
Subfamily Uropsilinae - Asian shrew-like moles (Chinese shrew moles)
 Genus Uropsilus - eight species in China, Bhutan, and Myanmar
Equivalent-teeth shrew mole, U. aequodonenia
Anderson's shrew mole, U. andersoni
 Black-backed shrew mole, U. atronates
Dabie Mountains shrew mole, U. dabieshanensis
Gracile shrew mole, U. gracilis
Inquisitive shrew mole, U. investigator
 Snow Mountain shrew mole, U. nivatus
Chinese shrew mole, U. soricipes
Subfamily Scalopinae - New World moles
 Tribe Condylurini - condylurine moles
 Genus Condylura - one species in eastern North America
Star-nosed mole, C. cristata
 Tribe Scalopini - scalopine moles
 Genus Alpiscaptulus - one species in China
Medog mole, A. medogensis
Genus Parascalops - one species in northeastern North America
Hairy-tailed mole, P. breweri
 Genus Scalopus - one species in eastern North America
Eastern mole, S. aquaticus
 Genus Scapanulus - one species in China
Gansu mole, S. oweni
 Genus Scapanus - five species in western North America
Mexican mole, S. anthonyi 
Northern broad-footed mole, S. latimanus
Southern broad-footed mole, S. occultus
Coast mole, S. orarius
Townsend's mole, S. townsendii
Subfamily Talpinae - Old World moles, desmans, and shrew moles
 Tribe Talpini - talpine moles
 Genus Euroscaptor - ten species in East, South, and Southeast Asia
 Greater Chinese mole, E. grandis
 Kloss's mole, E. klossi
 Kuznetsov's mole, E. kuznetsovi
 Long-nosed mole, E. longirostris
 Malaysian mole, E. malayanus 
 Himalayan mole, E. micrurus
 Ngoc Linh mole, E. ngoclinhensis
 Orlov's mole, E. orlovi
 Small-toothed mole, E. parvidens
 Vietnamese mole, E. subanura
 Genus Mogera - nine species from East Asia
Echigo mole, M. etigo
Small Japanese mole, M. imaizumii
Insular mole, M. insularis
Kano's mole, M. kanoana
La Touche's mole, M. latouchei
Ussuri mole, M. robusta
Sado mole, M. tokudae
Senkaku mole, M. uchidai
Japanese mole, M. wogura
 Genus Oreoscaptor - one species in Japan
Japanese mountain mole, O. mizura
Genus Parascaptor - one species in southern Asia
White-tailed mole, P. leucura
 Genus Scaptochirus - China
Short-faced mole, S. moschatus
 Genus Talpa - thirteen species, Europe and western Asia
Altai mole, T. altaica
Aquitanian mole, T. aquitania
Blind mole, T. caeca
Caucasian mole, T. caucasica
Père David's mole, T. davidiana
European mole, T. europaea
Levant mole, T. levantis
Martino's mole, T. martinorum
Spanish mole, T. occidentalis
Ognev's mole, T. ognevi
Roman mole, T. romana
Balkan mole, T. stankovici
Talysch mole, T. talyschensis
 Tribe Scaptonychini 
 Genus Scaptonyx - one species in China and Myanmar
 Long-tailed mole, S. fusicauda
 Tribe Desmanini - desmans
 Genus Desmana
 Russian desman, D. moschata
 Genus Galemys
 Pyrenean desman, G. pyrenaicus
 Tribe Urotrichini - Japanese shrew moles
 Genus Dymecodon
 True's shrew mole, D. pilirostris
 Genus Urotrichus
 Japanese shrew mole, U. talpoides
 Tribe Neurotrichini - New World shrew moles
 Genus Neurotrichus - Pacific northwest US, southwest British Columbia
 American shrew mole, N. gibbsii
Some studies suggest that this classification into three subfamilies is not entirely accurate, finding Uropsilinae to be the most basal member, then Desmanini, then a clade comprising Neurotrichini, Scaptonychini, and Urotrichini, then the Condylurini, and then Talpini and Scalopini being sister groups to one another. The current classification into 3 subfamilies renders both Talpinae and Scalopinae paraphyletic.

Unrelated mammals built like moles 
The following mammals have burrowing habits, and have by virtue of convergent evolution many derived characters in common with true moles from the family Talpidae but are nonetheless unrelated.
 Marsupial moles (2 species): Notoryctes typhlops, and N. caurinus.
 Golden moles (21 species), belonging to the Afrotheria.

Relationship with humans
All species in the family Talpidae are classed as "prohibited new organisms" under New Zealand's Hazardous Substances and New Organisms Act 1996, preventing them from being imported into the country.

See also
Mouldwarp

References

 
Mammal families
Extant Eocene first appearances
Taxa named by Gotthelf Fischer von Waldheim